The North Carolina State Treasurer is a statewide elected office in the U.S. state of North Carolina responsible for overseeing the financial operations of state government. The current state treasurer is Dale Folwell.

The office of state treasurer has existed since 1715 in the Province of North Carolina; at that time, the treasurer was appointed by the lower house of the legislature. In 1740, the treasurer's office was divided into two districts, and in 1779, into four. In 1784, the North Carolina General Assembly brought the treasurers under one single office, appointed jointly by both houses of the legislature.

Under the North Carolina Constitution of 1868, the treasurer became a position elected by popular vote, rather than appointed.

The North Carolina State Treasurer is an ex officio member of the North Carolina State Board of Education, the State Board of Community Colleges, the State Banking Commission, and the Council of State.

History of the office 

The Fundamental Constitutions of Carolina, adopted in 1669, provided for a treasurer to handle "all matters that concern the public revenue and treasury" with the assistance of 6 undertreasurers and 12 auditors. Despite this, early colonial governors of the Province of Carolina acted as their own treasurers due to minimal revenue. After the province incurred large debts during Cary's Rebellion and the Tuscarora War, the governor and his council appointed treasurers for each of the seven precincts of the province in 1711. In 1714 Governor Edward Hyde appointed Edward Moseley as treasurer of North Carolina and overseer of all precinct treasurers. He held the office until 1735, when he was made responsible for overseeing the "southern district" and William Downing was made responsible for the "northern district". The split system continued with different officeholders until 1776, when the North Carolina General Assembly required all treasurers to be appointed by themselves and barred them from holding other public offices. 

In 1779 and 1782 four and one additional treasury districts were respectively added, bring the total number to seven. In 1784 the positions were folded into one office located in Hillsborough with a two-year term on a salary. Memucan Hunt was the first person to hold the new office. In 1795 the state treasury was relocated to Raleigh, the new capital of the state, and some of the treasurer's bookkeeping functions were given to the state comptroller. In 1868 North Carolina ratified a new constitution which stipulated that the office be filled by a popularly elected candidate with four-year terms. From 1887 to 1899 the treasurer was responsible for oversight of the state banking industry.

North Carolina received a triple A bond credit rating for the first time in the early 1960s during the tenure of State Treasurer Edwin M. Gill and maintained the rating throughout the rest of his time in office. The Department of State Treasurer was created by the General Assembly in 1971. John Haywood, who served for 40 years from 1787 until 1827, was the longest-tenured treasurer. Janet Cowell, who assumed office in 2009, was the first woman to serve as state treasurer. The incumbent, Dale Folwell, has served as treasurer since January 1, 2017. He is the first Republican to hold the office since David A. Jenkins served during the Reconstruction era from 1868 to 1876.

Powers, duties, and structure 

The state treasurer is a constitutional officer. Article III, Section 7, of the Constitution of North Carolina stipulates the popular election of the treasurer every four years. The office holder is not subject to term limits. In the event of a vacancy in the office, the Governor of North Carolina has the authority to appoint a successor until a candidate is elected at the next general election for members of the General Assembly. They sit on the North Carolina Council of State and are ex officio chairman of the Local Government Commission, chairman of the State Banking Commission, member of the State Board of Education, and member of the State Board of Community Colleges. They are sixth in line of succession to the governor.

The treasurer leads the Department of State Treasurer, which has six divisions:  Retirement Systems Division, State Health Plan Division, Investment Management Division, State and Local Government Finance Division, Financial Operations Division, and Unclaimed Property Division. They are the sole fiduciary of the governmental employee pension fund and manage the State Health Plan. As with all Council of State officers, the treasurer's salary is fixed by the General Assembly and cannot be reduced during their term of office. In 2022, the treasurer's annual salary was $146,421.

List of State Treasurers

Colonial Treasurers
 Edward Moseley, 1715–1735
 William Smith, 1735

Northern District
 William Downing, 1735–1739
 William Smith, 1739–1740
 John Hodgson, 1740–1748
 Thomas Barker, 1748–1752
 John Haywood, 1752–1754
 Thomas Barker, 1754–1764
 Joseph Montfort, 1764–1775
 Samuel Johnston, 1775

Southern District
 Edward Moseley, 1735–1749
 Eleazer Allen, 1749–1750
 John Starkey, 1750–1765
 Samuel Swann, 1765–1766
 John Ashe, 1766–1773
 Richard Caswell, 1773–1775

State Treasurers

Districted
From 1777 to 1779, the State was divided into two districts, Northern and Southern, each with a treasurer. From 1779 to 1782, there were six districts, each with a treasurer, as follows: Edenton, Salisbury, Hillsboro, Halifax, New Bern, Wilmington. In 1782, a seventh district-Morgan-was created. In 1784, the district system was abandoned.
 John Ashe, 1777–1781 (Southern District, later Wilmington District)
 William Skinner, 1777–1784 (Northern District, later Edenton district)
 Green Hill, 1779–1784 (Halifax District)
 Richard Cogdell, 1779–1784 (New Bern District)
 William Cathey, 1779–1781 (Salisbury District)
 Matthew Jones, 1779–1782 (Hillsboro District)
 Timothy Bloodworth, 1781–1784 (Wilmington District)
 Robert Lanier, 1782–1784 (Salisbury District)
 Memucan Hunt, 1782–1784 (Hillsboro District)
 John Brown, 1782–1784 (Morgan District)
 Benjamin Exum, 1782–1784 (New Bern District)

Whole State

See also
North Carolina Local Government Commission

References

Works cited 
 
 
 

1715 establishments in North Carolina